Copelatus gibsoni is a species of diving beetle. It is part of the genus Copelatus in the subfamily Copelatinae of the family Dytiscidae. It was described by Vazirani in 1974.

References

gibsoni
Beetles described in 1974